Alexandra Aleksandrovna Raeva (née Saitova) (born in Moscow, Russia, on 20 August 1992) is a member of the Russian national women's curling team that will compete in Curling at the 2014 Winter Olympics – Women's tournament. She previously competed for the Russian junior national team, which won gold at the 2013 Winter Universiade. Raeva most recently won a silver medal at the 2017 World Women's Curling Championship in Beijing, China, following an 8–3 loss to Team Canada skipped by Rachel Homan.

Personal life
Raeva is married.

References

External links

Official website of Team Sidorova

Russian female curlers
Olympic curlers of Russia
Curlers at the 2014 Winter Olympics
Russian curling champions
Curlers from Moscow
1992 births
Living people
European curling champions
Universiade medalists in curling
Universiade gold medalists for Russia
Competitors at the 2013 Winter Universiade
Competitors at the 2015 Winter Universiade